Kentucky Route 104 is a 14.305-mile (23.022 km) state highway in Todd County, Kentucky that runs from Tennessee State Route 48 at the Kentucky-Tennessee state line northeast of Clarksville, Tennessee to Kentucky Route 181 just south of Elkton via Trenton.

History 
At the beginning of Kentucky's state highway system, KY 104's current routing was signed as Kentucky Route 181. KY 104 originally went from a junction with U.S. Route 79 at Guthrie to its current northern terminus. That alignment is now part of KY 181, and KY 104 moved to its current alignment at some time between 1939 and 1954.

Major intersections

References

0104
0104